Ramayana is one of the two major Sanskrit epics of ancient India.

Ramayana, Ramayan, or Ramayanam may also refer to:

Medieval works 
 Bhanubhakta Ramayana, a Nepali version of Valmiki Ramayana, written by Bhanubhakta Acharya
 Bilanka Ramayana, an Odia version of Ramayana, by 15th-century poet Sarala Dasa
 Jagamohana Ramayana, an Odia version of Ramayana by 15th-century poet Balarama Dasa
Saptakanda Ramayana, the 14th century Assamese version, written by Madhava Kandali
 Ranganatha Ramayanam, the Telugu version, written by Gona Budda Reddy
 Ramcharitmanas, the 16th century Hindi version, written by Tulsidas
 Ramavataram, the Tamil version, written by Kambar
 Krittivasi Ramayan, the Bengali version, written by Krittibas Ojha
 Kakawin Ramayana, an Old Javanese rendering of the Sanskrit Ramayana
 Ramakien, a Thai derivative of Kamba Ramayanam

Modern works
 The Ramayana (Narayan book), a 1972 English translation of Kamba Ramayana
 Ramayana (Rajagopalachari book), a 1957 abridged retelling of the Ramayana in English
 Sampoorna Ramayana, 1961 Hindi film directed by Babubhai Mistry
 Sampoorna Ramayanam (1971 film), a 1971 Telugu film directed by Bapu
Ramayana, a 1943 Japanese Tokusatsu film from Toho
 Ramayan 3392 A.D. or Ramayana Reborn, a comic book series
 Ramayan (1954 film), a Hindi religious film 
 Ramayana: The Legend of Prince Rama, 1992 Indo-Japanese film
 Ramayan (1987 TV series), an Indian television series on DD National
 Ramayan (2001 TV series), an Indian television series on Zee TV
 Ramayan (2008 TV series), an Indian television series on NDTV Imagine
 Ramayan (2012 TV series), an Indian television series
 Ramayanam (1996 film), a mythological Telugu film
 Geet Ramayan, a 1955 Marathi rendering in poetic format by G. D. Madgulkar
 Siya Ke Ram, a 2015–16 Indian television series on StarPlus

Other uses
 Ramayana bridge, a bridge connecting Rameswaram to Mannar, India
 Ramayana Centre, Port Louis, Mauritius
 Ramayana (department store), a major department store chain in Indonesia
 Ramayanam Sarveswara Sastry (1889–1962), Indian actor
 Versions of Ramayana